On IBM PC compatible computers, the turbo button selects one of two run states: the default "turbo" speed or a reduced speed closer to the Intel 8086 CPU. It was relatively common on computers using the Intel 80286, Intel 80386 and Intel 80486 processors, from the mid 1980s to mid 1990s. The name is inspired by turbocharger, a device which increases an engine's power and efficiency. When pressed, the "turbo" button is intended to let a computer run at the highest speed for which it had been designed.

Purpose 

With the introduction of CPUs which ran faster than the original 4.77 MHz Intel 8088 used in the IBM Personal Computer, programs which relied on the CPU's frequency for timing were executing faster than intended. Games in particular were often rendered unplayable. To provide some compatibility, the "turbo" button was added. Disengaging turbo mode slows the system down to a state compatible with original 8086/8088 chips.

Switching 

On most systems, turbo mode was with the button pushed in, but since the button could often be wired either way, on some systems it was the opposite.The turbo button could be linked to a turbo LED or two-digit segmented display on the system case, although in some cases, the indicated frequency (in MHz) was not a measure of the actual processor clocks, but the two "fast" and "slow" display options set by jumpers on the motherboard.

Some systems also supported keyboard combinations -- and -- for switching turbo mode on and off, such as the Packard Bell 486ES 3x3 (the 4x4 and MT models had a dedicated Turbo button). With all the 486ES models—those with and without a turbo button—the power light would show green in normal (“Turbo”) mode, and orange in Slow mode. ITT Xtra used -- to toggle.

Some keyboards had a turbo button as well, located near right Shift. Unlike the turbo button that was common on computer cases, the turbo button on the keyboards did not control the clock rate of the CPU; rather, it controlled the keyboard repeat rate.

Turbo display 

The turbo display is used to display the current frequency (MHz) speed of the CPU, this is usually done by a two or three-digit digital LED display. The displayed speed can vary depending on the CPU's frequency, and the settings of the computer, however, it is not measuring the frequency of the CPU, it displays preset numbers when turbo is turned on or off, and these numbers can be changed with two (or three) banks of jumpers on the back of the display, each bank changing each digit, as their purpose is to connect LED's in the display to (or disconnect from) power. The layout of the banks can vary.

Use 

The feature was relatively common on systems running 286 to 486 CPUs,
and less common on Pentium era computers. The frequency displays largely disappeared or were reprogrammed to display "HI"/"LO", "99", or were replaced with a three-digit display when CPU speeds reached 100 MHz, since most systems only had a two-digit display.

As new computers continued to get faster and had a wide variety of available speeds, it became impossible for software to rely on specific CPU speed. As software began to rely on other timing methods, the turbo feature became mostly irrelevant to new programs.

Software implementations 

While the implementation of an actual hardware turbo button has disappeared on modern machines, software developers have compensated with software replacements. One example is DOSBox, which offers an adjustable emulation rate. Modern PCs that support ACPI power management may provide software controls to switch ACPI performance states or other CPU throttling modes. This is used for power saving or to prevent CPU overheating rather than for compatibility, as modern applications use the real-time clock for timing instead of the CPU clock.

Turbo = Slow? 

Some computers have wired the turbo button in a way that if the button is pressed in, the computer is running in the slower speed. While the turbo button can be configured this way, this is not the intended way of using the button, as the computer is intended to run at full speed when the button is pressed in, hence the name turbo. This caused a lot of confusion and misunderstanding about the purpose and naming of the button in retro computer forums and communities. This issue can be solved by reconnecting the wires in the correct way on either the display, or on the motherboard of the computer. If the turbo LED is on, that always means the CPU is running at full speed, regardless of how the switch is wired.

References 
Turbo PC by Complete Business Systems, @1991 - 1994, Ira Kleiner

Computing input devices
Computer keys